Robert Joseph Kelly (June 6, 1925 – December 31, 2016) was a professional American football defensive back. He was a member of the Los Angeles Dons and Baltimore Colts of the All-America Football Conference. Kelly died in Tennessee on December 31, 2016, at the age of 91.

References

1925 births
2016 deaths
American football defensive backs
Baltimore Colts (1947–1950) players
Los Angeles Dons players
Military personnel from Illinois
Navy Midshipmen football players
Notre Dame Fighting Irish football players
Players of American football from Chicago